Hesudra is a genus of moths in the family Erebidae erected by Frederic Moore in 1878.

Species
 Hesudra bisecta Rothschild, 1912
 Hesudra divisa Moore, 1878
 Hesudra haighti Wileman & South
 Hesudra mjobergi Talbot, 1926

References

Lithosiina
Moth genera